The women's 1500 meter at the 2014 KNSB Dutch Single Distance Championships took place in Heerenveen at the Thialf ice skating rink on Friday 25 October 2013. Although this tournament was held in 2013, it was part of the 2013–2014 speed skating season.

There were 24 participants.

Title holder was Ireen Wüst.

There was a qualification selection incentive for the next following 2013–14 ISU Speed Skating World Cup tournaments.

Overview

Result

Draw

Source:

References

Single Distance Championships
2014 Single Distance
World